Eugène-Ghislain-Alfred Demolder (16 December 1862 – 8 October 1919) was a Belgian author.

He is probably best known among English speakers for his romantic novel Le jardinier de la Pompadour, (Madame de Pompadour's Gardener).  A novelist, short story writer, and art critic he was also educated in law.  His memoirs, Sous la robe (Under the Robe), offers a cultural view of the Belgian professional class of the late 19th century and its involvement in literary reform.  (See also cultural movements.)  His use of symbolism and mastery of ambience sets his novels apart from earlier romance pieces.

He was a member of La Jeune Belgique (The Young Belgium),  a literary review journal which encouraged a literary renaissance movement of 19th century Belgium. This movement was influential in raising the national consciousness of Belgians, ushering in modernism and discouraging romanticism.  Demolder contributed to La Jeune Belgique as an art critic and published an early monograph on symbolist artist, James Ensor in 1892.  Among his contemporaries were Emile Verhaeren, Max Sulzberger, Edouard Fetis.

Demolder was born in Sint-Jans-Molenbeek and died in Corbeil-Essonnes, France. He married Claire Dulac-Rops, the daughter of the Belgian illustrator and artist Félicien Rops.

List of works
 1889 - Impressions d'art, études, critiques, transpositions, critique d'art
 1891 - Contes d'Yperdamme
 1891 - Le Massacre des innocents
 1891 - Les Matines de Marie-Madeleine, conte de Pentecôte
 1893 - Récits de Nazareth
 1894 - Félicien Rops, étude patronymique
 1896 - La Legende d'Yperdamme
 1896 - Le Royaume authentique du grand Saint Nicolas
 1897 - Quatuor
 1897 - Sous la robe, (under the robe)
 1899 - La Mort aux berceaux 1899 - La Route d'émeraude, ("The Emerald Road")
 1901 - Le Cœur des pauvres 1901 - Constantin Meunier 1901 - Les Patins de la reine de Hollande 1901 - Trois contemporains: Henri de Brakeleer, Constantin Meunier, Félicien Rops 1901 - L'Agonie d'Albion 1904 - L'Arche de Monsieur Cheunus ("The arch of Mr. Cheunus")
 1904 - Le jardinier de la Pompadour has been included in Project Gutenberg
 1906 - L'Espagne en auto'', ("Spain by car")

References

External links

 
 
 Eugène Demolder at Feedboks 
 Correspondence from Eugène Demolder to Edmond Dèman at Mount Holyoke College

1862 births
1919 deaths
People from Molenbeek-Saint-Jean
Belgian writers in French